Mount Fuji Jazz Festival is an annual jazz festival held in August in the Lake Yamanaka area, Yamanashi Prefecture, Japan. The three-day festival features musicians from Blue Note Records and other, performing on different stages, 1986–96. Alfred Lion came to this festival for the first time in 1986.

Notable artists at the MountFuji Jazz Festival include Andrew Hill, Herbie Hancock, Gonzalo Rubalcaba, Ron Carter, James Newton, Albert Collins, Jimmy Smith, Bobby Hutcherson, Michael Brecker, Jackie McLean, Jazz Messengers, George Kawaguchi, McCoy Tyner, Stanley Jordan, Dianne Reeves, Tony Williams, Chaka Khan, Don Pullen, Sadao Watanabe, Chick Corea, Wynton Marsalis, Terumasa Hino, Bob Belden, John Scofield, Lee Ritenour, Hiromi Uehara, Junko Onishi, US3, Joe Henderson, Murakami PONTA Shuichi and Pat Metheny.

Live under the sky (established in 1977), Newport Jazz Festival in Madarao (established in 1982) and Mount Fuji Jazz Festival (established in 1986) are the big 3 jazz festival in the history of jazz in Japan.

Scenery

References

Jazz festivals in Japan
Summer festivals
Mount Fuji
1986 establishments in Japan
Music festivals established in 1986